Raymond Eliot "Butch" Nusspickel (June 13, 1905 – February 24, 1980) was an American football and baseball player, coach, and college athletics administrator.  He served as the head football coach at Illinois College from 1934 to 1936 and at the University of Illinois at Urbana–Champaign from 1942 to 1959, compiling a career college football record of 98–80–12.  Eliot was also the head baseball coach at Illinois College from 1933 to 1937.  His Illinois Fighting Illini football teams won three Big Ten Conference championships (1946, 1951, and 1953) and two Rose Bowls (1947 and 1952).  Eliot, who spent almost his entire career at the University of Illinois—he was a student athlete, an assistant football coach, head football coach, associate athletic director, and finally the interim athletic director for the university—was nicknamed "Mr. Illini."  He attended the University of Illinois, played as a guard on the football team in 1930 and 1931, and was a member of Alpha Sigma Phi fraternity.  He died of an apparent heart attack on February 24, 1980, in Urbana, Illinois.

Eliot is remembered by the Illinois High School Football Coaches Association through its Ray Eliot award.

Head coaching record

Football

Ice Hockey

See also
 List of presidents of the American Football Coaches Association

References

External links
 

1905 births
1980 deaths
American football guards
Illinois College Blueboys baseball coaches
Illinois College Blueboys football coaches
Illinois Fighting Illini athletic directors
Illinois Fighting Illini football players
Illinois Fighting Illini baseball coaches
Illinois Fighting Illini football coaches
University of Illinois Urbana-Champaign faculty
Sportspeople from Boston
Kents Hill School alumni
Players of American football from Boston